The Tunica Arena and Exposition Center is a 6,000-seat multi-purpose arena in Tunica, Mississippi, USA. It was built in 2000.

It has a seating capacity of 6,000 and paved parking for 1,100 vehicles, plus 600 additional parking spaces and 66 RV spaces.

The facility has 14 luxury skyboxes, full-service banquet facilities, two outdoor arenas and an adjacent pavilion with an additional  of exposition area. Also, 366 livestock stalls, showers, dressing areas and support services provide one of the region's largest covered environments for livestock shows.

External links 
 

Sports venues in Mississippi
Convention centers in Mississippi
Buildings and structures in Tunica County, Mississippi
Tourist attractions in Tunica County, Mississippi
Indoor arenas in Mississippi